The Corrigan-Radgowski Correctional Center is a Level 3 & 4 high-security prison with two facilities for male offenders, in the Uncasville section of Montville, Connecticut. The prison was opened on December 30, 1994. It is a part of the Connecticut Department of Correction.

The Corrigan Correctional Institution and the Radgowski Correctional Institution were merged in 2001 as the Corrigan-Radgowski Correctional Center. This facility, named after two DOC employees, Raymond L. Corrigan and Stanley J. Radgowski Jr., incarcerates both pretrial and sentenced criminals. The superior courts of Danielson, New London, Norwich, and Windham use this facility.

The primary Inmates Population consists of (as of January 1, 2014):
Accused: 365
Sentenced: 1,221
Total: 1,586 

The Radgowski Annex Building, which first opened in 1957, has a capacity of 257 prisoners. It temporarily closed in 1991 but reopened in 1997. In 2017 Governor of Connecticut Dan Malloy announced that the annex will close due to a lack of prisoners resulting from a lowered crime rate. Gov Ned Lamont announced Sept. 8th 2021, that the prison will close by the end of 2021 due to declining inmate population.

References

Prisons in Connecticut
Buildings and structures in New London County, Connecticut
1994 establishments in Connecticut